XHIO-FM is a radio station on 91.1 FM in Tuxtla Gutiérrez, Chiapas, Mexico. The station is owned by Radiorama and is known as La Poderosa with a grupera format.

History
XEIO-AM 840 received its concession on April 7, 1983. It was owned by Radiofónica de Chiapas, S.A. de C.V. and broadcast as a 10 kW daytimer. It later added nighttime transmissions at 2.5 kW.

It received clearance to move to FM in 2012.

References

Radio stations in Chiapas
Radio stations established in 1983